Place is an unincorporated community in the town of Farmington, Strafford County, New Hampshire, United States.

References

Unincorporated communities in Strafford County, New Hampshire
Unincorporated communities in New Hampshire